The Public Health Agency of Sweden (abbreviated Fohm) is a Swedish government agency with national responsibility for public health. It falls under the Ministry of Health and Social Affairs and works to promote public health and to prevent illness and injuries through education. It monitors the health of the population, infectious disease control measures, and public health interventions, and assists the Government in its decision-making process by providing facts and knowledge. The agency is tasked with minimizing negative environmental impact on human health, and participates in the work of the EU and international public health organisations, such as the WHO and IANPHI.

History
The agency was established in 2014 by a merger of the Swedish National Institute of Public Health and the Swedish Institute for Communicable Disease Control. It took on most of the responsibilities for environmental health and for environment and public health reports previously assigned to the National Board of Health and Welfare.

Organisation
The agency has about 450 employees and is based in Solna. It is led by Director-General Johan Carlson, and organized into five departments: Epidemiology and Evaluation, Knowledge support, Microbiology, Communications and Administration.

High-containment laboratory

The Public Health Agency of Sweden runs the only biosafety level 4 laboratory in the Nordic region — one of only six in Europe. The laboratory is located at the headquarters in Solna, and has been in operation since 2001. It is built of wholly encased steel, totally isolated from the rest of the premises. The entire building is kept at negative air pressure, to prevent any contagion spreading outdoors, and laboratory access is limited to approximately 20 employees, pre-screened by the Swedish Security Service. Patients with highly infectious diseases are usually treated at high-containment medical facilities in Linköping University Hospital or at Karolinska University Hospital.

See also
For similar agencies elsewhere, please see the list of national public health agencies.

References

External links
Public Health Agency of Sweden - Official site (English)

Government agencies of Sweden
Medical and health organizations based in Sweden
Public health organizations
2014 establishments in Sweden
National public health agencies